Herbertów  is a district of Zelów, Poland, located in the northwestern part of the town.

During the German occupation of Poland (World War II), a subcamp of the Nazi German prison in Sieradz was located in the Herbertów.

References

Bełchatów County
Neighbourhoods in Poland